The 2003–04 NBA season was the Lakers' 56th season in the National Basketball Association and 44th in the city of Los Angeles.

The Lakers entered the season following a disappointing second-round loss to the eventual champion San Antonio Spurs in the 2003 playoffs. During the offseason, the Lakers signed star free agents Karl Malone and Gary Payton and re-signed free agent power forward Horace Grant. Following these acquisitions, the Lakers became the instant favorites to win the NBA title.

Despite major acquisitions, key moves, and becoming overnight title favorites, the Lakers would run into major setbacks to begin the season. During the 2003 off-season, superstar guard Kobe Bryant had been accused of sexual assault in Colorado. Media attention surrounding the case would prove to be an ongoing distraction for the team, and Bryant missed games during his trial. In addition, Bryant's feud with superstar center Shaquille O'Neal reached a peak during the season, as both players criticized each other in the media. Payton struggled with coach Phil Jackson's triangle offense, and Malone missed significant time due to injuries.

Despite the setbacks, the Lakers finished the season with a 56–26 overall record, good enough to clinch the second seed in the Western Conference en route to the playoffs. In the playoffs, they defeated the Houston Rockets, the defending champion San Antonio Spurs, and the Minnesota Timberwolves to earn the franchise its 28th appearance in the NBA Finals. The Lakers entered the Finals against the Detroit Pistons as favorites.
This was the third meeting between the Lakers and the Pistons in the NBA Finals, after both franchises met in 1988 and 1989.  However, the underdog Pistons' strong defense and teamwork propelled them to their third championship in franchise history, and the star-studded Lakers would collapse in five games. After the season, Jackson and the team mutually agree to part ways and O'Neal (who requested a trade) was dealt to the Miami Heat.

Draft picks

Roster

Regular season

Season standings

By division

By conference

Game log

|- style="background:#cfc;"
| 1
| October 28
| Dallas
| W 109–93
| Gary Payton (21)
| Karl Malone (10)
| Malone & Payton (9)
| Staples Center18,997
| 1–0

|- style="background:#cfc;"
| 2
| November 1
| @ Phoenix
| W 103–99
| Shaquille O'Neal (24)
| 3 players tied (12)
| Gary Payton (9)
| American West Arena18,422
| 2–0
|- style="background:#cfc;"
| 3
| November 2
| Golden State
| W 87–72
| Kobe Bryant (21)
| Shaquille O'Neal (14)
| Gary Payton (11)
| Staples Center18,997
| 3–0
|- style="background:#cfc;"
| 4
| November 4
| @ Milwaukee
| W 113–107
| Kobe Bryant (31)
| Shaquille O'Neal (14)
| Kobe Bryant (8)
| Bradley Center18,717
| 4–0
|- style="background:#cfc;"
| 5
| November 6
| @ San Antonio
| W 120–117 (2OT)
| Kobe Bryant (37)
| Shaquille O'Neal (20)
| O'Neal & Payton (6)
| SBC Center18,717
| 5–0
|- style="background:#fcc;"
| 6
| November 7
| @ New Orleans
| L 95–114
| Shaquille O'Neal (21)
| Malone & O'Neal (6)
| Gary Payton (11)
| New Orleans Arena18,717
| 5–1
|- style="background:#fcc;"
| 7
| November 10
| @ Memphis
| L 95–105
| Shaquille O'Neal (20)
| Shaquille O'Neal (12)
| Kobe Bryant (5)
| Pyramid Arena19,351
| 5–2
|- style="background:#cfc;"
| 8
| November 12
| Toronto
| W 94–79
| Shaquille O'Neal (23)
| Shaquille O'Neal (14)
| Gary Payton (6)
| Staples Center18,997
| 6–2
|- style="background:#cfc;"
| 9
| November 14
| Detroit
| W 94–89
| O'Neal & Payton (21)
| Shaquille O'Neal (15)
| Shaquille O'Neal (8)
| Staples Center18,997
| 7–2
|- style="background:#cfc;"
| 10
| November 16
| Miami
| W 99–77
| Kobe Bryant (27)
| Karl Malone (10)
| Gary Payton (8)
| Staples Center18,997
| 8–2
|- style="background:#fcc;"
| 11
| November 18
| @ Detroit
| L 96–106
| Malone & O'Neal (20)
| Shaquille O'Neal (10)
| 3 players tied (5)
| The Palace of Auburn Hills22,076
| 8–3
|- style="background:#cfc;"
| 12
| November 19
| @ New York
| W 104–83
| Shaquille O'Neal (23)
| Karl Malone (14)
| Bryant & Malone (4)
| Madison Square Garden19,763
| 9–3
|- style="background:#cfc;"
| 13
| November 21
| Chicago
| W 101–94
| Kobe Bryant (28)
| Karl Malone (18)
| Bryant & Payton (4)
| Staples Center18,997
| 10–3
|- style="background:#cfc;"
| 14
| November 23
| Memphis
| W 121–89
| Kobe Bryant (28)
| Slava Medvedenko (11)
| Gary Payton (10)
| Staples Center18,997
| 11–3
|- style="background:#cfc;"
| 15
| November 26
| Washington
| W 120–99
| Kobe Bryant (22)
| Horace Grant (6)
| Malone & Payton (5)
| Staples Center18,997
| 12–3
|- style="background:#cfc;"
| 16
| November 28
| San Antonio
| W 103–87
| Devean George (19)
| Karl Malone (11)
| Karl Malone (10)
| Staples Center18,997
| 13–3
|- style="background:#cfc;"
| 17
| November 30
| Indiana
| W 99–77
| Shaquille O'Neal (23)
| Karl Malone (15)
| Kobe Bryant (7)
| Staples Center18,997
| 14–3

|- style="background:#cfc;"
| 18
| December 3
| @ San Antonio
| W 90–86
| Kobe Bryant (21)
| Shaquille O'Neal (16)
| Gary Payton (6)
| SBC Center18,841
| 15–3
|- style="background:#cfc;"
| 19
| December 4
| @ Dallas
| W 114–103
| Kobe Bryant (32)
| Shaquille O'Neal (19)
| Gary Payton (8)
| American Airlines Center20,596
| 16–3
|- style="background:#cfc;"
| 20
| December 7
| Utah
| W 94–92
| Bryant & O'Neal (19)
| Shaquille O'Neal (15)
| Shaquille O'Neal (8)
| Staples Center18,997
| 17–3
|- style="background:#cfc;"
| 21
| December 9
| New York
| W 98–90
| Kobe Bryant (21)
| Shaquille O'Neal (15)
| Kobe Bryant (9)
| Staples Center18,997
| 18–3
|- style="background:#fcc;"
| 22
| December 12
| Dallas
| L 93–110
| Shaquille O'Neal (25)
| Shaquille O'Neal (14)
| Kobe Bryant (6)
| Staples Center18,997
| 18–4
|- style="background:#fcc;"
| 23
| December 13
| @ Portland
| L 108–112
| Kobe Bryant (35)
| Shaquille O'Neal (10)
| Kobe Bryant (6)
| Rose Garden20,630
| 18–5
|- style="background:#cfc;"
| 24
| December 19
| Denver
| W 101–99
| Shaquille O'Neal (26)
| Shaquille O'Neal (11)
| Gary Payton (11)
| Staples Center18,997
| 19–5
|- style="background:#cfc;"
| 25
| December 21
| Phoenix
| W 107–101
| George & Payton (19)
| Shaquille O'Neal (18)
| Gary Payton (7)
| Staples Center18,997
| 20–5
|- style="background:#fcc;"
| 26
| December 23
| @ Golden State
| L 98–107
| Kobe Bryant (23)
| Devean George (9)
| Gary Payton (13)
| The Arena in Oakland20,310
| 20–6
|- style="background:#fcc;"
| 27
| December 25
| Houston
| L 87–99
| Kobe Bryant (23)
| Horace Grant (11)
| Gary Payton (7)
| Staples Center18,997
| 20–7
|- style="background:#cfc;"
| 28
| December 28
| Boston
| W 105–82
| Shaquille O'Neal (22)
| Shaquille O'Neal (16)
| Bryant & Payton (6)
| Staples Center18,997
| 21–7

|- style="background:#fcc;"
| 29
| January 2
| @ Seattle
| L 109–111
| Kobe Bryant (32)
| Bryant & Grant (6)
| Kobe Bryant (6)
| KeyArena17,072
| 21–8
|- style="background:#fcc;"
| 30
| January 4
| @ L.A. Clippers
| L 98–101
| Kobe Bryant (44)
| Kobe Bryant (10)
| Payton & Russell (4)
| Staples Center19,653
| 21–9
|- style="background:#fcc;"
| 31
| January 6
| @ Minnesota
| L 90–106
| Kobe Bryant (20)
| Kobe Bryant (10)
| Derek Fisher (5)
| Target Center20,095
| 21–10
|- style="background:#fcc;"
| 32
| January 7
| @ Denver
| L 91–113
| Kobe Bryant (27)
| Brian Cook (8)
| Kobe Bryant (6)
| Pepsi Center19,739
| 21–11
|- style="background:#cfc;"
| 33
| January 9
| Atlanta
| W 113–67
| Bryant & Medvedenko (26)
| Slava Medvedenko (11)
| Gary Payton (7)
| Staples Center18,997
| 22–11
|- style="background:#cfc;"
| 34
| January 12
| Cleveland
| W 89–79
| Cook & Payton (13)
| Devean George (12)
| Fisher & Payton (4)
| Staples Center18,997
| 23–11
|- style="background:#cfc;"
| 35
| January 14
| Denver
| W 97–71
| Slava Medvedenko (22)
| Horace Grant (11)
| Gary Payton (6)
| Staples Center18,997
| 24–11
|- style="background:#fcc;"
| 36
| January 16
| @ Sacramento
| L 83–103
| Kareem Rush (30)
| Medvedenko & Sampson (9)
| Luke Walton (5)
| ARCO Arena17,317
| 24–12
|- style="background:#cfc;"
| 37
| January 17
| L.A. Clippers
| W 91–89
| Slava Medvedenko (20)
| Medvedenko & Sampson (10)
| Gary Payton (15)
| Staples Center18,997
| 25–12
|- style="background:#fcc;"
| 38
| January 19
| Phoenix
| L 85–88
| Kareem Rush (18)
| Payton & Sampson (8)
| Gary Payton (9)
| Staples Center18,997
| 25–13
|- style="background:#fcc;"
| 39
| January 21
| @ Memphis
| L 82–88
| Gary Payton (24)
| Slava Medvedenko (12)
| Kareem Rush (5)
| Pyramid Arena19,351
| 25–14
|- style="background:#fcc;"
| 40
| January 22
| @ Dallas
| L 87–106
| Devean George (24)
| Luke Walton (7)
| Gary Payton (5)
| American Airlines Center20,512
| 25–15
|- style="background:#cfc;"
| 41
| January 24
| @ Utah
| W 93–86
| Slava Medvedenko (26)
| Slava Medvedenko (12)
| Bryant & Payton (6)
| Delta Center19,911
| 26–15
|- style="background:#cfc;"
| 42
| January 28
| Seattle
| W 96–82
| Gary Payton (24)
| Horace Grant (10)
| Gary Payton (5)
| Staples Center18,997
| 27–15
|- style="background:#fcc;"
| 43
| January 30
| Minnesota
| L 84–97
| Shaquille O'Neal (22)
| Shaquille O'Neal (9)
| Gary Payton (9)
| Staples Center18,997
| 27–16

|- style="background:#cfc;"
| 44
| February 1
| @ Toronto
| W 84–83
| Shaquille O'Neal (36)
| Horace Grant (9)
| Shaquille O'Neal (5)
| Air Canada Centre20,116
| 28–16
|- style="background:#fcc;"
| 45
| February 2
| @ Indiana
| L 72–85
| Slava Medvedenko (14)
| Gary Payton (8)
| Gary Payton (7)
| Conseco Fieldhouse18,345
| 28–17
|- style="background:#cfc;"
| 46
| February 4
| @ Cleveland
| W 111–106 (OT)
| Shaquille O'Neal (37)
| Grant & O'Neal (12)
| O'Neal & Payton (6)
| Gund Arena20,562
| 29–17
|- style="background:#fcc;"
| 47
| February 5
| @ Philadelphia
| L 73–96
| Shaquille O'Neal (17)
| Shaquille O'Neal (8)
| Fisher & Walton (5)
| Wachovia Center20,965
| 29–18
|- style="background:#cfc;"
| 48
| February 8
| @ Orlando
| W 98–96
| Shaquille O'Neal (20)
| Shaquille O'Neal (10)
| Luke Walton (7)
| TD Waterhouse Centre17,283
| 30–18
|- style="background:#cfc;"
| 49
| February 10
| @ Miami
| W 98–83
| Shaquille O'Neal (25)
| Devean George (11)
| Fisher & Payton (6)
| American Airlines Arena16,500
| 31–18
|- style="background:#fcc;"
| 50
| February 11
| @ Houston
| L 87–102
| Shaquille O'Neal (24)
| Shaquille O'Neal (9)
| Shaquille O'Neal (4)
| Toyota Center18,218
| 31–19
|- style="text-align:center;"
| colspan="9" style="background:#bbcaff;"|All-Star Break
|- style="background:#cfc;"
| 51
| February 17
| Portland
| W 89–86
| Kobe Bryant (31)
| Shaquille O'Neal (11)
| Kobe Bryant (10)
| Staples Center18,997
| 32–19
|- style="background:#cfc;"
| 52
| February 18
| @ Golden State
| W 100–99
| Kobe Bryant (35)
| Shaquille O'Neal (16)
| Kobe Bryant (8)
| The Arena in Oakland20,252
| 33–19
|- style="background:#cfc;"
| 53
| February 20
| Philadelphia
| W 116–88
| Shaquille O'Neal (29)
| Shaquille O'Neal (13)
| Bryant & Fisher (7)
| Staples Center18,997
| 34–19
|- style="background:#cfc;"
| 54
| February 22
| @ Phoenix
| W 104–92
| Kobe Bryant (40)
| Bryant & Fox (7)
| 3 players tied (5)
| American West Arena18,422
| 35–19
|- style="background:#cfc;"
| 55
| February 25
| @ Denver
| W 112–111
| Kobe Bryant (35)
| Shaquille O'Neal (8)
| Kobe Bryant (10)
| Pepsi Center19,812
| 36–19
|- style="background:#fcc;"
| 56
| February 26
| Sacramento
| L 101–103
| Kobe Bryant (35)
| Kobe Bryant (11)
| Bryant & Payton (6)
| Staples Center18,997
| 36–20
|- style="background:#cfc;"
| 57
| February 28
| @ Washington
| W 122–110
| Shaquille O'Neal (19)
| Kobe Bryant (14)
| Kobe Bryant (10)
| MCI Center20,173
| 37–20
|- style="background:#cfc;"
| 58
| February 29
| @ New Jersey
| W 100–83
| Shaquille O'Neal (19)
| Shaquille O'Neal (14)
| Kobe Bryant (10)
| Continental Airlines Arena19,968
| 38–20

|- style="background:#fcc;"
| 59
| March 2
| @ Atlanta
| L 93–94
| O'Neal & Payton (23)
| Shaquille O'Neal (14)
| Gary Payton (10)
| Philips Arena19,445
| 38–21
|- style="background:#cfc;"
| 60
| March 3
| @ Houston
| W 96–93
| Shaquille O'Neal (28)
| Kobe Bryant (8)
| Kobe Bryant (13)
| Toyota Center18,172
| 39–21
|- style="background:#cfc;"
| 61
| March 5
| Seattle
| W 99–91
| Shaquille O'Neal (32)
| Luke Walton (9)
| Fox & Payton (7)
| Staples Center18,997
| 40–21
|- style="background:#cfc;"
| 62
| March 7
| New Jersey
| W 94–88
| Shaquille O'Neal (32)
| O'Neal & Payton (9)
| Rick Fox (5)
| Staples Center18,997
| 41–21
|- style="background:#fcc;"
| 63
| March 8
| @ Utah
| L 83–88
| Gary Payton (21)
| Shaquille O'Neal (10)
| Gary Payton (7)
| Delta Center19,911
| 41–22
|- style="background:#cfc;"
| 64
| March 10
| @ Boston
| W 117–109
| Shaquille O'Neal (28)
| Shaquille O'Neal (17)
| Kobe Bryant (10)
| FleetCenter18,624
| 42–22
|- style="background:#fcc;"
| 65
| March 12
| @ Minnesota
| L 86–96
| Shaquille O'Neal (24)
| Shaquille O'Neal (13)
| Fox & Payton (6)
| Target Center20,391
| 42–23
|- style="background:#cfc;"
| 66
| March 13
| @ Chicago
| W 88–81
| Kobe Bryant (35)
| Shaquille O'Neal (15)
| Karl Malone (7)
| United Center23,067
| 43–23
|- style="background:#cfc;"
| 67
| March 15
| Orlando
| W 113–110 (OT)
| Kobe Bryant (38)
| Shaquille O'Neal (23)
| Bryant & Malone (4)
| Staples Center18,997
| 44–23
|- style="background:#cfc;"
| 68
| March 17
| @ L.A. Clippers
| W 106–103
| Kobe Bryant (27)
| Shaquille O'Neal (11)
| Gary Payton (7)
| Staples Center19,668
| 45–23
|- style="background:#cfc;"
| 69
| March 19
| L.A. Clippers
| W 106–100
| Kobe Bryant (27)
| Shaquille O'Neal (10)
| Fox & O'Neal (6)
| Staples Center18,997
| 46–23
|- style="background:#cfc;"
| 70
| March 21
| Milwaukee
| W 104–103 (OT)
| Shaquille O'Neal (31)
| Shaquille O'Neal (26)
| Gary Payton (6)
| Staples Center18,997
| 47–23
|- style="background:#cfc;"
| 71
| March 24
| Sacramento
| W 115–91
| Kobe Bryant (36)
| Shaquille O'Neal (16)
| Bryant & O'Neal (6)
| Staples Center18,997
| 48–23
|- style="background:#cfc;"
| 72
| March 26
| Minnesota
| W 90–73
| Kobe Bryant (35)
| Shaquille O'Neal (18)
| Kobe Bryant (5)
| Staples Center18,997
| 49–23
|- style="background:#cfc;"
| 73
| March 28
| Utah
| W 91–84
| Kobe Bryant (34)
| Shaquille O'Neal (14)
| Kobe Bryant (4)
| Staples Center18,997
| 50–23
|- style="background:#cfc;"
| 74
| March 30
| New Orleans
| W 107–88
| Kobe Bryant (23)
| Shaquille O'Neal (9)
| Karl Malone (9)
| Staples Center18,997
| 51–23

|- style="background:#cfc;"
| 75
| April 1
| Houston
| W 93–85
| Kobe Bryant (26)
| Karl Malone (14)
| Karl Malone (6)
| Staples Center18,997
| 52–23
|- style="background:#cfc;"
| 76
| April 2
| @ Seattle
| W 97–86
| Kobe Bryant (25)
| Shaquille O'Neal (14)
| Rick Fox (6)
| KeyArena17,072
| 53–23
|- style="background:#fcc;"
| 77
| April 4
| San Antonio
| L 89–95
| Kobe Bryant (28)
| Malone & O'Neal (9)
| Malone & O'Neal (4)
| Staples Center18,997
| 53–24
|- style="background:#fcc;"
| 78
| April 6
| Portland
| L 80–91
| Shaquille O'Neal (17)
| Shaquille O'Neal (12)
| Kobe Bryant (8)
| Staples Center18,997
| 53–25
|- style="background:#cfc;"
| 79
| April 9
| Memphis
| W 103–95
| Kobe Bryant (33)
| Shaquille O'Neal (12)
| Bryant & Payton (7)
| Staples Center18,997
| 54–25
|- style="background:#fcc;"
| 80
| April 11
| @ Sacramento
| L 85–102
| Gary Payton (15)
| Karl Malone (11)
| Fisher & George (5)
| ARCO Arena17,317
| 54–26
|- style="background:#cfc;"
| 81
| April 13
| Golden State
| W 109–104
| Kobe Bryant (45)
| Shaquille O'Neal (13)
| Kobe Bryant (8)
| Staples Center18,997
| 55–26
|- style="background:#cfc;"
| 82
| April 14
| @ Portland
| W 105–104 (2OT)
| Kobe Bryant (37)
| Medvedenko & O'Neal (14)
| Fisher & Payton (6)
| Rose Garden20,609
| 56–26

Record vs. opponents

Playoffs

|- align="center" bgcolor="#ccffcc"
| 1
| April 17
| Houston
| W 72–71
| Shaquille O'Neal (20)
| Shaquille O'Neal (17)
| Kobe Bryant (6)
| Staples Center18,997
| 1–0
|- align="center" bgcolor="#ccffcc"
| 2
| April 19
| Houston
| W 98–84
| Kobe Bryant (36)
| Karl Malone (8)
| Gary Payton (7)
| Staples Center18,997
| 2–0
|- align="center" bgcolor="#ffcccc"
| 3
| April 23
| @ Houston
| L 91–102
| Shaquille O'Neal (25)
| Malone & O'Neal (11)
| Gary Payton (7)
| Toyota Center18,226
| 2–1
|- align="center" bgcolor="#ccffcc"
| 4
| April 25
| @ Houston
| W 92–88 (OT)
| Karl Malone (30)
| Karl Malone (13)
| Gary Payton (7)
| Toyota Center18,219
| 3–1
|- align="center" bgcolor="#ccffcc"
| 5
| April 28
| Houston
| W 97–78
| Kobe Bryant (31)
| Malone & O'Neal (9)
| Kobe Bryant (10)
| Staples Center18,997
| 4–1
|-

|- align="center" bgcolor="#ffcccc"
| 1
| May 2
| @ San Antonio
| L 78–88
| Kobe Bryant (31)
| Shaquille O'Neal (13)
| Karl Malone (5)
| SBC Center18,797
| 0–1
|- align="center" bgcolor="#ffcccc"
| 2
| May 5
| @ San Antonio
| L 85–95
| Shaquille O'Neal (32)
| Shaquille O'Neal (15)
| Kobe Bryant (8)
| SBC Center18,797
| 0–2
|- align="center" bgcolor="#ccffcc"
| 3
| May 9
| San Antonio
| W 105–81
| Shaquille O'Neal (28)
| Shaquille O'Neal (15)
| Gary Payton (7)
| Staples Center18,997
| 1–2
|- align="center" bgcolor="#ccffcc"
| 4
| May 11
| San Antonio
| W 98–90
| Kobe Bryant (42)
| Shaquille O'Neal (14)
| Karl Malone (6)
| Staples Center18,997
| 2–2
|- align="center" bgcolor="#ccffcc"
| 5
| May 13
| @ San Antonio
| W 74–73
| Kobe Bryant (22)
| Karl Malone (12)
| Gary Payton (7)
| SBC Center18,797
| 3–2
|- align="center" bgcolor="#ccffcc"
| 6
| May 15
| San Antonio
| W 88–76
| Kobe Bryant (26)
| Shaquille O'Neal (19)
| Bryant & Payton (7)
| Staples Center18,997
| 4–2
|-

|- align="center" bgcolor="#ccffcc"
| 1
| May 21
| @ Minnesota
| W 97–88
| Shaquille O'Neal (27)
| Shaquille O'Neal (18)
| Bryant & Fisher (6)
| Target Center19,552
| 1–0
|- align="center" bgcolor="#ffcccc"
| 2
| May 23
| @ Minnesota
| L 71–89
| Kobe Bryant (27)
| Shaquille O'Neal (16)
| Kobe Bryant (6)
| Target Center19,707
| 1–1
|- align="center" bgcolor="#ccffcc"
| 3
| May 25
| Minnesota
| W 100–89
| Bryant & O'Neal (22)
| Shaquille O'Neal (17)
| Gary Payton (9)
| Staples Center18,997
| 2–1
|- align="center" bgcolor="#ccffcc"
| 4
| May 27
| Minnesota
| W 92–85
| Kobe Bryant (31)
| Shaquille O'Neal (19)
| Kobe Bryant (8)
| Staples Center18,997
| 3–1
|- align="center" bgcolor="#ffcccc"
| 5
| May 29
| @ Minnesota
| L 96–98
| Kobe Bryant (23)
| Shaquille O'Neal (13)
| Kobe Bryant (7)
| Target Center20,109
| 3–2
|- align="center" bgcolor="#ccffcc"
| 6
| May 31
| Minnesota
| W 96–90
| Shaquille O'Neal (25)
| Shaquille O'Neal (11)
| Gary Payton (8)
| Staples Center18,997
| 4–2
|-

|- align="center" bgcolor="#ffcccc"
| 1
| June 6
| Detroit
| L 75–87
| Shaquille O'Neal (34)
| Malone & O'Neal (11)
| Kobe Bryant (4)
| Staples Center18,997
| 0–1
|- align="center" bgcolor="#ccffcc"
| 2
| June 8
| Detroit
| W 99–91 (OT)
| Kobe Bryant (33)
| Karl Malone (9)
| Luke Walton (8)
| Staples Center18,997
| 1–1
|- align="center" bgcolor="#ffcccc"
| 3
| June 10
| @ Detroit
| L 68–88
| Shaquille O'Neal (14)
| Medvedenko & O'Neal (8)
| Gary Payton (7)
| The Palace of Auburn Hills22,076
| 1–2
|- align="center" bgcolor="#ffcccc"
| 4
| June 13
| @ Detroit
| L 80–88
| Shaquille O'Neal (36)
| Shaquille O'Neal (20)
| Rick Fox (6)
| The Palace of Auburn Hills22,076
| 1–3
|- align="center" bgcolor="#ffcccc"
| 5
| June 15
| @ Detroit
| L 87–100
| Kobe Bryant (24)
| Shaquille O'Neal (8)
| Luke Walton (5)
| The Palace of Auburn Hills22,076
| 1–4
|-

NBA Finals

Series summary

 (OT) denotes a game that required overtime.

The Finals were played using a 2-3-2 site format, where the first two and last two games are held at the team with home court advantage. This is only used in the Finals, all other playoff games are held in a 2-2-1-1-1 format (the team with home court advantage starts).

Background
The Lakers had a star-studded lineup that included offseason acquisitions Karl Malone and Gary Payton as well as mainstays Kobe Bryant and Shaquille O'Neal. Malone and Payton were perennial All-Stars; Payton had led the Seattle SuperSonics to the Finals in 1996, while Malone's Utah Jazz reached the Finals in 1997 and 1998.  However, both had been defeated by Michael Jordan's Chicago Bulls. By 2003, Malone and Payton were in the latter stages of their respective careers and were no longer playing on championship-contending teams. Both Malone and Payton took pay cuts to sign with the Lakers in an effort to win a championship.

Game One
Sunday, June 6, 2004, 14:30 at the Staples Center.

Considered to be a stunning upset by most of the NBA world, the Detroit Pistons managed to defeat the Lakers with imposing defense. Defensively clamping down on everyone but Bryant and O'Neal, the Pistons managed to hold everyone else to a total of 16 points.

The Pistons trailed the Lakers 41–40 at halftime, but a 10–4 surge capped by Billups's 3-pointer gave the Pistons the lead. O'Neal's foul trouble furthered the scoring gap, with the Pistons leading by 13 points early in the fourth quarter.

Box Score

Game Two
Tuesday, June 8, 2004, 15:04 at the Staples Center.

The second game was close throughout the first half, but in the third quarter Detroit would score 30 points, cutting the deficit 68–66. However, at the end of the fourth quarter, Kobe Bryant's 3-point shot at 2.1 seconds left tied the game at 89–89. The Lakers outscored the Pistons 10–2 in overtime.

Box Score

Game Three
Thursday, June 10, 2004, 14:31 at The Palace of Auburn Hills.

The Pistons beat Los Angeles by 20 in their first NBA Finals appearance together at The Palace of Auburn Hills since 1989 to take a 2–1 lead in the series. The 68 points scored by the Lakers set a franchise record for the fewest points scored in a playoff game. Previous night, a group of overzealous Pistons fans made it difficult for the Lakers to get their rest by harassing them until 4 am at their hotel in nearby Birmingham. Fans were screaming outside the building until management at the hotel called the police.

Box Score

Game Four
Sunday, June 13, 2004, 14:49 at The Palace of Auburn Hills.

Again, the Pistons defeated the Lakers, although this time by eight, to take a 3–1 series advantage.

Box Score

Game Five
Tuesday, June 15, 2004, 14:32 at The Palace of Auburn Hills.

In Game 5, the Pistons won their first championship since 1990, and Larry Brown finally won his title. The Pistons defense had overcome the high-scoring Laker offense, winning the game by 13, winning the series 4-1, and also ending a long Laker dynasty that lasted for many years.  The game saw the end of Phil Jackson's first run as the coach (he returned for the 2005-06 season), and saw O'Neal, Payton, and Malone's last games in Laker uniforms (O'Neal and Payton were both acquired by the soon-to-be NBA Champions Miami Heat and Malone retired).

Box Score

Player stats

Regular season

Playoffs

Award winners
 Shaquille O'Neal, All-NBA First Team
 Kobe Bryant, All-NBA First Team
 Kobe Bryant, NBA All-Defensive First Team
 Shaquille O'Neal, NBA All-Star Game Most Valuable Player Award

Transactions

References

External links
 Lakers on Database Basketball
 Lakers on Basketball Reference

Los Angeles Lakers seasons
Western Conference (NBA) championship seasons
Los Angle
Los Angle
Los Angle